Barrack Street is one of two major cross-streets in the central business district of Perth, Western Australia, Australia. 

Barrack Street may also refer to:

Streets
 Barrack Street, Hobart, Tasmania, Australia
 Barrack Street, the location of Elizabeth Fort in Cork, Ireland
 Barrack Street, the location of The McManus: Dundee's Art Gallery and Museum in Dundee, Scotland
 Barrack Street, a section of R328 road in Dunmore, Galway, Ireland

Other uses
Barrack Street, a greyhound in the 1969 English Greyhound Derby

See also 
 Barrack Street Bridge, Perth
 Barrack Street Jetty, Perth
 Barrack Square
 Barrack (disambiguation)